Teleosauroidea is an extinct superfamily of thalattosuchian crocodyliforms living from the Early Jurassic to the Early Cretaceous.

References

Thalattosuchians
Animal superfamilies